Edward Shippen Barnes (September 14, 1887 in Seabright, New Jersey – February 14, 1958, in Idyllwild, California) was an American organist.

Life and career
He was a graduate of Yale University, where he studied with Horatio Parker and Harry Jepson. After graduating from Yale, Barnes continued his studies in Paris with Louis Vierne, Vincent D'Indy, and Abel Decaux.

He worked as organist at the Church of the Incarnation, New York (1911–1912), Rutgers Presbyterian Church, New York (1913–1924), St. Stephen's Episcopal Church, Philadelphia (1924–1938), and the First Presbyterian Church, Santa Monica (1938–1958). He also composed two organ symphonies, other smaller organ works, arranged works for the organ and wrote books about religious music.

He also wrote an instructional organ method, The School Of Organ Playing (1921), and was editor of the magazine "American Organ Monthly."

Discography
 The Organ Symphonies of Edward Shippen Barnes, performed by Simon Nieminski; 1937 Wicks organ, St Mary's RC Cathedral, Peoria, Illinois, USA: Pro Organo, January 2001. Pro Organo CD 7131

Compositions
 Hush, my dear, lie still and slumber; Christmas carol-anthem & cappella. New York, C. Fischer, inc., 1933. 1 p.l., 5 p. 27 cm.

References

Christmas Songbook Wiki - Edward Shippen Barnes
Organ Symphonies of Edward Shippen Barnes – Simon Nieminski, Organist
Cyber Hymnal - Edward Shippen Barnes
[ AllMusic.com  - Edward Shippen Barnes]
American Public Media – Pipedreams #0547

External links

American classical organists
American male organists
1887 births
1958 deaths
Yale University alumni
Pupils of Horatio Parker
Pupils of Louis Vierne
Pupils of Vincent d'Indy
American male composers
American composers
20th-century organists
20th-century American male musicians
Male classical organists